"Bereden väg för Herran" ("Make Way For the Lord") is a Christian hymn with lyrics by Frans Michael Franzén in 1812. Britt G. Hallqvist later rewrote the final verse lyrics. Describing Jesus coming into Jerusalem, it is a popular Advent song.

Publications
Riddarholmskyrkans handskrivna koralbok 1694.
Ovikens kyrkas handskrivna koralbok late 18th century
1819 års psalmbok as number 53 under the lines "Jesu kärleksfulla uppenbarelse i mänskligheten: Jesu anträde till sitt medlarekall (adventspsalmer)".
Svensk psalmbok för den evangelisk-lutherska kyrkan i Finland 1886 as number 4 under the lines "Adventspsalmer".
Sionstoner 1889 as number 551 under the lines "Psalmer".
Nya Pilgrimssånger 1892 number 25 of the lines "Om Kristus — Kristi ankomst"
Svenska Missionsförbundets sångbok 1920 as number 74 under the lines "B. Jesu födelse 73-99"
Frälsningsarméns sångbok 1929 as number 534 under the lines "Högtider och särskilda tillfällen - Jul".
Musik till Frälsningsarméns sångbok 1930 as number 534
Sionstoner 1935 as number 142 under the lines "Advent".
1937 års psalmbok as number3 under the lines "Advent".
Svensk psalmbok för den evangelisk-lutherska kyrkan i Finland 1943 as number 3 under the lines "Advent".
Sånger för Frälsningsarméns möten 1948 as number 141 under the lines "Hemlands- och speciella sånger".
Förbundstoner 1957 as number 33 under the lines "Guds uppenbarelse i Kristus: Advent"
Segertoner 1960 as number 160
Psalmer för bruk vid krigsmakten 1961 as number 3 verserna 1-4.
Frälsningsarméns sångbok 1968 as number 580 under the lines "Högtider - Advent".
Den svenska psalmboken 1986 as number 103 under the lines "Advent".
Svensk psalmbok för den evangelisk-lutherska kyrkan i Finland (1986) as number 4 without compound i titelraden till "Bered en väg för Herran", under the lines "Advent".
Lova Herren 1988 as number 87 under the lines "Advent".
Sångboken 1998 as number 4
Barnens svenska sångbok, 1999, under the lines "Året runt".
Julens önskesångbok, 1997, under the lines "Advent" (melody following the Boda tradition, and folk tune).

Recordings
An early recording was done by Engelbrekt's Church Choir on 6 March 1941, and the record was released in November 1950.

References

1812 songs
Advent songs
Swedish-language songs
Lutheran hymns
Songs about Jesus
19th-century hymns